Carmichaelia petriei is a species of New Zealand broom belong to the genus Carmichaelia. It is endemic to New Zealand. C. petrieis is possibly a host plant for the critically endangered fungus weevil Cerius otagensis.

Taxonomy

Carmichaelia petriei was first described by Thomas Kirk in his book The students' flora of New Zealand and the outlying islands published in 1899. He named the plant in honour of Donald Petrie, the discoverer of the species. The isolectotype specimen of C. petriei can be found at the Auckland War Memorial Museum.

Description

Carmichaelia petriei is an upright but stout looking shrub, sparingly branched and growing up to 2.5 meters high and 2 meters wide. Its branchlets are coloured green, yellow green or bronze green and are leafless. Its flowers are coloured violet, purple and white and can be seen from November to January. The shrub produces seed from January to May. It can be distinguished from other Carmichaelia species by the appearance of its seed pods which droop as they ripen and seeds that drop off when they reach maturity.

Distribution
Carmichaelia petriei is endemic to New Zealand and can be found in the South Island, as far north as the upper part of the Waitaki River Valley in Canterbury, as well as in the MacKenzie Basin, Otago and Southland including Stewart Island.

Habitat
This species grows in scrub and tussock grassland among rocks in montane, lowland or coastal sites. It can be found in river gorges or on terraces, cliffs and in the margins of forests.

Ecology
One of only four specimens of the critically endangered fungus weevil Cerius otagensis was collected from the beating of a C. petriei plant. That this weevil was collected from C. petriei implies that this species of Carmichaelia may be a host plant for that endangered insect.

Conservation status
Carmichaelia petriei had a large stable population and was therefore classified by the Department of Conservation (DOC) as being "Not Threatened" in 2013. but in 2017, it was reclassified as "At Risk - Declining".

References

External links

 Observations and images by citizen scientists logged in Naturewatch NZ

Plants described in 1899
Endemic flora of New Zealand
Flora of the South Island
petriei
Taxa named by Thomas Kirk